Malaysia competed at the 2022 Commonwealth Games in Birmingham, England, from 28 July to 8 August 2022. It is Malaysia's 14th appearance at the Commonwealth Games.

Powerlifter Bonnie Bunyau Gustin and squash athlete Aifa Azman were the country's opening ceremony flagbearers.

Background

Preparations
Shahrul Zaman Yahya was appointed as the chef-de-mission of the delegation on 25 September 2021 during the 198th Olympic Council of Malaysia (OCM) Executive Council meeting which was held on virtual basis.

On 29 December 2021, the OCM Selection Committee under the Chairmanship of OCM President Tan Sri Dato’ Sri Norza Zakaria held a meeting to discuss the selection criteria for the 2022 Commonwealth Games and decided that:

 For Category A, athletes and teams will have to be in the top 4;
 For Category B, athletes and teams will have to be in the top 8 (reduced from top 16 due to tightened criteria); And,
 The Committee will utilise competitions from 2018 to May 2022, including 2021 Southeast Asian Games as basis for selection.
On 14 June 2022, in a selection committee meeting, the OCM initially set a seven-gold medal target for the contingent and chose Bonnie Bunyau Gustin and Sivasangari Subramaniam as flag bearers. However, Sivasangari had to withdraw after she was involved in a road accident. Aifa Azman was announced as Sivasangari's replacement. The gold medal target for the contingent was reduced to six on 19 July 2022 after taking into consideration the personal records and current status of the national athletes. The Malaysian delegation managed to win seven golds, eight silvers and eight bronzes, equalling the achievement of seven golds, five silvers and 12 bronzes at the 2018 edition and surpassing the six-gold target, as well as improving its position from 12th to 10th place.

During the opening ceremony, the Malaysian delegation was represented by 40 athletes and officials wearing white five-button baju Melayu and short modern kebaya featuring the national flower - hibiscus with a hand-painted batik-like abstract interpretation by a local designer.

Russel Taib and Gilbert Daim were the flag bearers at the closing ceremony.

Broadcasters

Medalists

| width="78%" align="left" valign="top" |

Competitors
Malaysia received a quota of 92 open allocation slots from Commonwealth Sport. This quota is used to determine the overall team in sports lacking a qualifying system. A total of 107 competitors are set to compete in the Games.

The following is the list of number of competitors participating at the Games per sport/discipline.

Athletics

A squad of seven athletes was confirmed as of 13 July 2022.

Men
Track and road events

Field events

Women
Track and road events

Field events

Badminton

As of 1 June 2022, Malaysia qualified for the mixed team event via the BWF World Rankings. A full squad of ten players was revealed on 18 June 2022. However, Lee Zii Jia announced his withdrawal from the squad on 23 June 2022 to focus on the World Championships. Ng Tze Yong was then announced as Lee's replacement.

Singles

Doubles

Mixed team

Summary

Squad

Ng Tze Yong 
Aaron Chia
Soh Wooi Yik
Chan Peng Soon
Tan Kian Meng
Goh Jin Wei
Pearly Tan
Thinaah Muralitharan
Cheah Yee See
Lai Pei Jing

Group stage

Quarterfinal

Semifinal

Final

3x3 basketball

As of 19 May 2022, Malaysia accepted a Bipartite Invitation for the men's wheelchair tournament.

Summary

Men's wheelchair

Roster
Ahmad Nazri Hamzah
Muhammad Roozaimi Johari
Muhamad Atib Zakaria
Freday Tan Yei Bing

Group A

Semifinal

Bronze medal match

Boxing

As of 30 June 2022, two boxers will take part in the competition.

Men

Cycling

As of 4 July 2022, six cyclists will take part in the competition.

Track
Sprint

Keirin

Time trial

Diving

A squad of twelve divers was confirmed as of 11 July 2022.

Men

Women

Mixed

Gymnastics

As of 20 June 2022, three gymnasts will take part in the competition.

Artistic
Men
Individual Qualification

Individual Finals

Women
Individual Qualification

Rhythmic
Team Final & Individual Qualification

Individual Finals

Judo

 
Malaysia entered two judoka (one men and one women) into the Commonwealth tournament.

Lawn bowls

Men

Women

Para powerlifting

Rugby sevens

As of 28 November 2021, Malaysia qualified for the men's tournament. This was achieved through their position in the 2021 Asia Rugby Sevens Series.

The fifteen-man roster was officially named as of 9 July 2022. It was later reduced to 13 athletes.

Summary

Men's tournament

Roster
 
Ameer Nasrun Zulkefli
Kamal Hamidi
Shah Izwan Nordin
Wan Azley Wan Omar
Azizul Hakim Che Oon
Safiy Md Said
Azwan Zuwairi Mat Zizi
Eddie Ariff Ferdaus Freedy
Adam Ariff Alias
Amalul Hazim Nasarrudin
Daim Zainuddin
Hafiezie Sudin
Zulhilmi Azizad

Reserves
Suhairi Effendi Mohd Othman
Harith Iqbal

Pool B

Classification Quarterfinals

13-16 Semifinals

Squash

A squad of nine players was confirmed on 15 June 2022. Sivasangari Subramaniam then had to withdraw due to injuries from a road accident.

Singles

Doubles

Swimming

A squad of four swimmers was confirmed as of 12 July 2022.

Men

Women

Table tennis

As of 11 February 2022, Malaysia qualified for the men's and women's team events via the ITTF World Rankings. Eight players were selected as of 7 July 2022.

Singles

Doubles

Team

Triathlon

As of 6 July 2022, two triathletes will take part in the competition. However, Chong Xian Hao announced his withdrawal on 23 July 2022 because suffered an injury during a training session.

Individual

Weightlifting

Aniq Kasdan and Aznil Bidin qualified by winning their categories at the 2021 Commonwealth Weightlifting Championships in Tashkent, Uzbekistan. Five others qualified via the IWF Commonwealth Ranking List, which was finalised on 9 March 2022.

Men

Women

See also
Malaysia at the 2022 Winter Olympics

References

External links
Olympic Council of Malaysia Official site
Birmingham 2022 Commonwealth Games Official site

2022
Nations at the 2022 Commonwealth Games
Commonwealth Games